Simon Tam (born March 30, 1981) is an American author, musician, activist, and entrepreneur. He is best known as the bassist and founder of the Asian American dance-rock band, the Slants, who won their case against the U.S. Patent & Trademark Office at the United States Supreme Court. The case, Matal v. Tam, was a landmark legal battle that clarified First Amendment rights in trademark law. The court ruled unanimously in Tam's favor, holding that trademark registrations may not be rejected under the Disparagement Clause of the Lanham Act (1946) since that would be considered viewpoint discrimination; this includes, as in Tam's case, trademarks using such language filed by members of minority groups who wish to reclaim slurs that would have been previously denied.

Early life and career 
Tam was born and raised in San Diego, California. At age 13, he started his first record label, SBG Records.

He attended Grossmont College, Mt. San Jacinto College, and University of California, Riverside, where he double-majored in philosophy and religious studies. During this time, he started a music promotion company and was the co-owner of a vintage clothing shop in Temecula, CA called The Populuxe. A few months before graduating, Tam dropped out of college to join The Stivs, a punk band based in Portland, Oregon.  While with the band, he worked on releases "T.B.I.L Revisited" and "Sweet Heartache and the Satisfaction." The band made a short appearance on The Price Is Right, and Bob Barker lent his voice as an introduction to their album.

In 2004, Tam left The Stivs to form an all-Asian American members rock band. This eventually became the Slants, the prominent Asian American band that defined most of Tam's career. During most of his time in Portland, Tam worked for nonprofit organizations as a marketing director and served on the board of numerous social justice organizations. He also finished his college education and graduated with a Master in Business Administration from Marylhurst University in 2013, receiving the Distinguished Alum Award, and began publishing his writing. During this time, he co-founded the Oregon Center for Human Rights, partnered with his sister to open a restaurant, and established several other businesses.

In 2017, he moved to Nashville, Tennessee.

After retiring from touring with the Slants in 2019, Tam continued to endeavor in other art forms, including storytelling, theatre, composing, and art. In 2020, Tam was selected as an artist in residence for the UNC Process Series, debuting a work for the Remembrance and Renewal Storytelling Festival. In 2021, Tam and his longtime collaborator in the Slants, Joe X. Jiang, were selected artists for the Cincinnati Fringe Festival's development program and Borderlight Festival. That same year, Tam and Jiang composed scores for television shows streaming on the Peacock Network, including Comedy InvAsian 2.0, and the film Namba: A Japanese American's Incarceration and Life of Resistance. In 2022, Tam and Jiang were selected as chosen as artists for Opera Theatre of Saint Louis' New Works Collective program to develop a new groundbreaking opera based on Tam's journey to the Supreme Court.

The Slants and the Supreme Court case, Matal v. Tam
In 2006, Tam formed the Slants. He says the band's name was chosen "as a way of seizing control of a racial slur, turning it on its head and draining its venom. It was also a respectful nod to Asian-Americans who had been using the epithet for decades.".

In late 2009, Tam's attorney recommended that he file an application to register the band's trademark. This eventually became an extensive legal battle when the United States Patent and Trademark Office (USPTO) ruled that the band's name was disparaging to persons of Asian descent. The USPTO relied on UrbanDictionary.com to support its claim. Initially, Tam provided extensive evidence to appeal the USPTO decision, including testimonies from leading dictionary experts, national surveys, and letters from Asian American community leaders, but the Trademark Office remained steadfast in their refusal. In 2011, Tam filed a second application that focused on procedural and evidentiary issues in its appeal. The United States Court of Appeals for the Federal Circuit initially ruled against him but issued a Motion to vacate Sua sponte (on its own accord). They invited Tam to be arguing the constitutional merits of the law being used against him.

In 2015, the court ruled in a 9-to-3 vote that the law used by the USPTO violated the First Amendment. The USPTO appealed the decision to the Supreme Court. In 2017, the Supreme Court of the United States agreed and ruled unanimously in Tam's favor in Matal v. Tam.

Tam has continued to remain active in First Amendment activism after the conclusion of his Supreme Court case. In 2019, he joined prominent hip-hop artists Killer Mike, Chance the Rapper, Meek Mill, and 21 Savage in filing an amicus brief in Jamal Knox v. Commonwealth of Pennsylvania. He also filed a brief at the Supreme Court on behalf of Erik Brunetti in Iancu v. Brunetti, often known as the sister case to Matal v. Tam, which struck down the "scandalous" and "immoral" provisions of the Lanham Act. Additionally, he often speaks at legal and community events around the world on Matal v. Tam. In addition, he leads Continuing Learning Education (CLE) credit courses for attorneys and teaches on Matal v. Tam. He was honored with the First Amendment Award from the Hugh M. Hefner Foundation, the Mark T. Banner Award from the American Bar Association, and Milestone Case of the Year from Managing IP Magazine for his activism.

Media and public appearances 
In 2010, Tam started a music industry blog on his music company's website, Last Stop Booking (formerly Populuxe Entertainment). Soon after, became a frequent contributor for Music Think Tank, ASCAP, and had a regular column on the Huffington Post. Eventually, he published two books on the music industry, How to Get Sponsorships and Endorsements and Music Business Hacks.

In late 2011, Tam began writing on racism and the Asian American experience for sites like CHANGELAB's Race Files and YOMYOMF. In 2012, his essay, "A Slanted View," was published in Where Are You From? An Anthology of Asian American Writing. Shortly after, he published numerous op-ed pieces on his trademark case, Matal v. Tam, for newspapers such as the New York Times and The Oregonian. He also began writing short pieces for feminist publication Bitch Media.

In 2015, Tam's essay, Trademark Offense was published in Oregon Humanities magazine. It was later listed as an honorable mention in America's Best Essays 2016.

In 2019, Tam published his memoir, Slanted: How an Asian American Troublemaker Took on the Supreme Court. The memoir covers multiple aspects of his life as an artist-activist, including growing up as a child of immigrant restaurant owners, falling in love with punk rock, and the journey to the U.S Supreme Court. It won the silver award for Best autobiography/Memoir from the Independent Publisher Book Awards.

As a speaker, Tam often delivers keynotes and workshops for Fortune 500 companies as well as higher education organizations, with a focus on entrepreneurship, marketing, technology, and diversity and inclusion. He has made 13 TEDx appearances as a speaker and performer. In 2016, Tam joined President Barack Obama, George Takei, Jeremy Lin, and other celebrities in the #ActToChange campaign to fight bullying.

Tam hosts the podcast show Music Business Hacks. In addition, he is a regular contributor for Billboard, Music Think Tank, ASCAP, and Huffington Post. In 2018, he established The Slants Foundation, a nonprofit organization that provides scholarships and mentoring Asian American artists looking to incorporate community activism into their craft. Tam also serves on the board of directors for numerous organizations.

Discography 

 1996: PR (Hardtack Records) – Pop Punk Ska Funk
 1998: Rockaway Teens (SBG Records) – Rock n' Roll Songs From High School
 1998: A-OK (SBG Records) – 5-Song EP (producer)
 1999: SBG Records – Something for the Kids (compilation CD, producer)
 2004: The Stivs (The Stivs) – T.B.I.L. Revisited
 2005: The Stivs (Boot to Head Records) – Sweet Heartache and the Satisfaction
 2007: The Slants (The Slants) – Slanted Eyes, Slanted Hearts
 2009: The Slants (The Slants) – Slants! Slants! Revolution
 2010: The Slants (The Slants) – Pageantry
 2012: The Slants (The Slants) – The Yellow Album
 2016: The Slants (The Slants) – Something Slanted This Way Comes
 2017: The Slants (In Music We Trust Records) – The Band Who Must Not Be Named EP
 2018: The Slants (WYNC Studios) – 27: The Most Perfect Album
 2019: The Slants (The Slants) – The Slants EP

Bibliography
 2012: How to Get Sponsorships and Endorsements
 2012: Where Are You From?: An Anthology of Asian American Writing (Volume 1)
 2014: "Music Business Hacks: The Daily Habits of the Self-Made Musician"
2015: "Trademark Offense" (essay published in Oregon Humanities magazine)
2017: "The Power on Repurposing a Slur" (essay published by The New York Times)
2018: "Day of Judgement" (essay published in Oregon Humanities magazine)
2019: Slanted: How an Asian American Troublemaker Took on the Supreme Court

TEDx appearances
In addition to his active speaking career, Tam was made numerous appearances at TEDx events as a performer and speaker:

 2014: TEDxUofW - A New Slant on Racism (talk)
 2014: TEDxSalem - Your Life Has a Word Count Limit - Make Every Word Count (talk)
 2014: TEDxSalem - The Slants (performance)
 2014: TEDxSpokane - Give Racism a Chance (talk)
 2014: TEDxSpokane - The Slants (performance)
 2015: TEDxUofW - How to Talk With a White Supremacist (talk)
 2015: TEDxFrontRange - The Innovation of Immigrants (talk)
 2015: TEDxColoradoSprings - Pitching Your Way to the TEDx Stage (talk)
 2015: TEDxErie - Losing the Line Between Art and Activism (talk)
 2016: TEDxMarylhurstU (host)
 2017: TEDxBend - Yes, Read the Comments Section (talk)
 2017: TEDxBend - From the Heart with The Slants (performance)
 2018: TEDxDupontCircleEd - Once Upon an App: An Online Dating Fairytale (talk)

Honors and awards

 2007: Top 5 Asian American Albums by AsiaXpress
 2008: Album of the Year by Portland Music Awards
 2008: Best Local Album by Willamette Week
 2009: Album of the Year by RockWired
 2009: Hardest Working Asian American Band
 2014: Portland Rising Star by Light a Fire Awards
 2015: Distinguished Alumni Award by Marylhurst University
 2017: Freedom Fighter for Environmental Justice by Roosevelt Freedom Fighters
 2017: Citizen of the Year by Chinese American Citizens Alliance - Portland Lodge
 2018: Milestone Case of the Year by Managing IP Magazine
 2018: Mark T. Banner Award by the American Bar Association
 2018: Hugh M. Hefner First Amendment Award in Arts & Entertainment
2019: Ovation Lifetime Achievement Award by Greater Austin Asian Chamber of Commerce
2020: Top 25 Books on the Constitution of All Time by Book Authority
2020: Silver Award for Best Autobiography/Memoir by the Independent Publisher Book Awards

References

External links
Simon Tam's author website
The Slants website
Music Business Hacks website
Last Stop Booking website

1981 births
Living people
American musicians of Asian descent
Musicians from San Diego
American rock musicians